Marie Madeleine Togo is a Malian politician. She serves as the Malian Minister of Health and Public Hygiene.

References

Living people
Government ministers of Mali
21st-century Malian women politicians
21st-century Malian politicians
Year of birth missing (living people)
Place of birth missing (living people)
21st-century Malian people